Ardian Turku is a member of the Assembly of the Republic of Albania for the Democratic Party of Albania.  He formerly served as mayor of Elbasan between 2003 and 2004.

References

Living people
Democratic Party of Albania politicians
Mayors of Elbasan
Government ministers of Albania
Tourism ministers of Albania
Members of the Parliament of Albania
21st-century Albanian politicians
Culture ministers of Albania
Year of birth missing (living people)